Irene Gilbert (22 January 1903 – October 1988) was a British swimmer. She competed in the women's 200 metre breaststroke event at the 1924 Summer Olympics.

References

External links
 

1903 births
1988 deaths
British female swimmers
Olympic swimmers of Great Britain
Swimmers at the 1924 Summer Olympics
Sportspeople from Sheffield
Female breaststroke swimmers